Brian Farrell is a current professional lacrosse player for the Ohio Machine of the MLL. He attended the University of Maryland and was a three-time USILA All-American defender and two-time captain for the Terrapins. He was a 2011 MLL Champion with the Boston Cannons and was recently traded to the Ohio Machine in 2013.

References 

1988 births
Living people
Lacrosse players from Baltimore
Maryland Terrapins men's lacrosse players
Boston Cannons players
Ohio Machine players
Lacrosse defenders